The 1997 Nottingham Open was an ATP tournament held in Nottingham, Great Britain that was part of the World Series of the 1997 ATP Tour. It was the eighth edition of the tournament and was held from 16 June to 22 June 1997.

Greg Rusedski won his first title of the year and the sixth of his career.

Finals

Singles

 Greg Rusedski defeated  Karol Kučera, 6–4, 7–5

Doubles

 Ellis Ferreira /  Patrick Galbraith defeated  Danny Sapsford /  Chris Wilkinson, 4–6, 7–6, 7–6

References

 
Nottingham
Nottingham Open